Michael Joseph Behe (born January 18, 1952) is an American biochemist and author, widely known as an advocate of the pseudoscientific principle of intelligent design (ID). He serves as professor of biochemistry at Lehigh University in Pennsylvania and as a senior fellow of the Discovery Institute's Center for Science and Culture. Behe is best known as an advocate for the validity of the argument for irreducible complexity (IC), which claims that some biochemical structures are too complex to be explained by known evolutionary mechanisms and are therefore probably the result of intelligent design. Behe has testified in several court cases related to intelligent design, including the court case Kitzmiller v. Dover Area School District where his views were cited in the ruling that intelligent design is not science and is religious in nature.

Behe's claims about the irreducible complexity of essential cellular structures have been rejected by the vast majority of the scientific community, and his own biology department at Lehigh University published a statement repudiating Behe's views and intelligent design.

Education and academics 
Behe grew up in Harrisburg, Pennsylvania, where he attended grade school at St. Margaret Mary School and later graduated from Bishop McDevitt High School. He graduated from Drexel University in 1974 with a Bachelor of Science in chemistry. He received his PhD in biochemistry at the University of Pennsylvania in 1978 for his dissertation research on sickle-cell disease. From 1978 to 1982, he did postdoctoral work on DNA structure at the National Institutes of Health. From 1982 to 1985, he was assistant professor of chemistry at Queens College in New York City, where he met his wife, Celeste. In 1985, he moved to Lehigh University and is currently a Professor of Biochemistry. From 2005 to 2015, Lehigh University's Department of Biological Sciences exhibited a position statement on its website stating that its faculty reject Behe's views on evolution:

As of 2021, his faculty webpage includes "Disclaimer. My arguments about irreducible complexity and intelligent design are my own, and are not endorsed either by Lehigh University in general or by the Department of Biological Sciences in particular."

Irreducible complexity and intelligent design

Behe says he once fully accepted the scientific theory of evolution, but that after reading Evolution: A Theory in Crisis (1985), by Michael Denton, he came to question evolution. Later, Behe came to believe that there was evidence, at a biochemical level, that some biological systems were "irreducibly complex". He thought that these systems could not, even in principle, have evolved by natural selection. He believed that the only possible alternative explanation for such complex structures was that they were created by an "intelligent designer".   Irreducible complexity has been rejected by the scientific community.

The 1987 Edwards v. Aguillard U.S. Supreme Court decision barred the required teaching of creation science from public schools but allowed evolutionary theory on the grounds of scientific validity. After the decision, a later draft of the textbook Of Pandas and People (1989) systematically replaced each and every cognate of the word "creation" with the phrase "intelligent design" or similar ID terms. The books of lawyer Phillip E. Johnson on theistic realism dealt directly with criticism of evolutionary theory and its purported biased "materialist" science, and aimed to legitimize the teaching of creationism in schools. In March 1992, a conference at Southern Methodist University brought Behe together with other leading figures into what Johnson later called the "wedge strategy." In 1993, the "Johnson-Behe cadre of scholars" met at Pajaro Dunes, California, and Behe presented for the first time his idea of irreducibly complex molecular machinery. Following a summer 1995 conference, "The Death of Materialism and the Renewal of Culture," the group obtained funding through the Discovery Institute. In 1996, Behe became a senior fellow of the Discovery Institute's "Center for the Renewal of Science and Culture" (later renamed the Center for Science and Culture), an organization dedicated to promoting intelligent design.

For the 1993 edition of Pandas, Behe wrote a chapter on blood clotting, presenting arguments which he later presented in very similar terms in a chapter in his 1996 book Darwin's Black Box. Behe later agreed that they were essentially the same when he defended intelligent design at the Dover trial.

Darwin's Black Box

In 1996, Behe published his ideas on irreducible complexity in his book Darwin's Black Box. Behe's refusal to identify the nature of any proposed intelligent designer frustrates scientists, who see it as a move to avoid any possibility of testing the positive claims of ID while allowing him and the intelligent design movement to distance themselves from some of the more overtly religiously motivated critics of evolution.

As to the identity of the intelligent designer, Behe responds that if, deep in the woods, one were to come across a group of flowers that clearly spelled out the name "LEHIGH", one would have no doubt that the pattern was the result of intelligent design. Determining who the designer was, however, would not be nearly as easy. He remarks:

"Inferences to design do not require that we have a candidate for the role of designer.  We can determine that a system was designed by examining the system itself, and we can hold the conviction of design much more strongly than a conviction about the identity of the designer." — Darwin's Black Box, pp. 195–196

"… 'designer' is often seen as a not-too-subtle code word for God, both by those who like the implications and by those who don't.  …Like it or not, a raft of important distinctions intervene between a conclusion of design and identification of a designer. …The designer need not necessarily even be a truly 'supernatural' being. …if one wishes to be academically rigorous, one can't leap directly from design to a transcendent God. …To reach a transcendent God, other, nonscientific arguments have to be made – philosophical and theological arguments. It is not my purpose here to rehearse what has been said over the millennia on that score, or to say why I myself find some of those arguments persuasive and others not. Here I'm content to 'take "purposeful designer" in a very broad sense. — The Edge of Evolution (2007), pp. 227–229

Behe gives the following reply to the assertion that intelligent design is "unfalsifiable" or that he is attempting to avoid the possibility of testing the positive claims of intelligent design:

 
"In fact, my argument for intelligent design is open to direct experimental rebuttal. Here is a thought experiment that makes the point clear. In Darwin's Black Box (Behe 1996) I claimed that the bacterial flagellum was irreducibly complex and so required deliberate intelligent design. The flip side of this claim is that the flagellum can't be produced by natural selection acting on random mutation, or any other unintelligent process. To falsify such a claim, a scientist could go into the laboratory, place a bacterial species lacking a flagellum under some selective pressure (for mobility, say), grow it for ten thousand generations, and see if a flagellum--or any equally complex system--was produced. If that happened, my claims would be neatly disproven."

To this, these responses have been made:
"Behe's claim that intelligent design would be 'disproven' is not correct for the simple fact that no legitimate test of the intelligent design theory has been provided in his example. Once again, what we have to acknowledge is that in order to test intelligent design theory, the required test conditions must be such that the causal interaction between an intelligent agent and organism must be available to observation....  Behe's suggestion of an experiment involving active selection for mobility is quite irrelevant to testing an intelligent design theory since the causal conditions involve the experimenter, not the intelligent agent to which the theory refers."

"Behe is wrong.  Even if his experiment did produce the flagellum, ID's proponents could argue that the intelligent agent was merely acting in the test tube.  There is no way to tell, from this experiment, whether the intelligent agent was actually working inside the laboratory; therefore, the test does not falsify the theory."

"There simply is no way to replicate the number of sequential trials (i.e. the total population of bacteria or the amount of genetic variation within that population) or the amount of time involved....[A computer simulation] showed that a binding site that Behe himself characterized as irreducibly complex could evolve in 20,000 years. Yet here he is demanding that scientists do an actual experiment with actual bacteria, the numbers of which could not possibly be contained in a lab, on the evolution of a much more complex biochemical system that would almost certainly take longer to evolve than the whole of recorded human history."

Behe has charged that his detractors are inconsistent:

"Coyne's conclusion that design is unfalsifiable, however, seems to be at odds with the arguments of other reviewers of my book. Clearly, Russell Doolittle (Doolittle 1997), Kenneth Miller (Miller 1999), and others have advanced scientific arguments aimed at falsifying ID. ...If the results with knock-out mice (Bugge et al. 1996) had been as Doolittle first thought, or if Barry Hall's work (Hall 1999) had indeed shown what Miller implied, then they correctly believed my claims about irreducible complexity would have suffered quite a blow.  And since my claim for intelligent design requires that no unintelligent process be sufficient to produce such irreducibly complex systems, then the plausibility of ID would suffer enormously. …Now, one can't have it both ways. One can't say both that ID is unfalsifiable (or untestable) and that there is evidence against it. Either it is unfalsifiable and floats serenely beyond experimental reproach, or it can be criticized on the basis of our observations and is therefore testable.  The fact that critical reviewers advance scientific arguments against ID (whether successfully or not) shows that intelligent design is indeed falsifiable."
Unlike William A. Dembski and others in the intelligent design movement, Behe accepts the common descent of species, including that humans descended from other primates, although he states that common descent does not by itself explain the differences between species. He also accepts the scientific consensus on the age of the Earth and the age of the Universe. In his own words:
"Evolution is a controversial topic, so it is necessary to address a few basic questions at the beginning of the book.  Many people think that questioning Darwinian evolution must be equivalent to espousing creationism.  As commonly understood, creationism involves belief in an earth formed only about ten thousand years ago, an interpretation of the Bible that is still very popular.  For the record, I have no reason to doubt that the universe is the billions of years old that physicists say it is.  Further, I find the idea of common descent (that all organisms share a common ancestor) fairly convincing, and have no particular reason to doubt it.  I greatly respect the work of my colleagues who study the development and behavior of organisms within an evolutionary framework, and I think that evolutionary biologists have contributed enormously to our understanding of the world.  Although Darwin's mechanism – natural selection working on variation – might explain many things, however, I do not believe it explains molecular life.  I also do not think it surprising that the new science of the very small might change the way we view the less small."  Darwin's Black Box, pp 5–6.
"For example, both humans and chimps have a broken copy of a gene that in other mammals helps make vitamin C.  ... It's hard to imagine how there could be stronger evidence for common ancestry of chimps and humans.  ... Despite some remaining puzzles, there's no reason to doubt that Darwin had this point right, that all creatures on earth are biological relatives."  The Edge of Evolution, pp. 71–72
"…it's understandable that some people find the idea of common descent so astonishing that they look no further.  Yet in a very strong sense the explanation of common descent is also trivial.  Common descent tries to account only for the similarities between creatures.  It says merely that certain shared features were there from the beginning – the ancestor had them...In contrast, Darwin's hypothesized mechanism of evolution – the compound concept of random mutation paired with natural selection…tries to account for the differences between creatures. …What could cause such staggering transformations? …By far the most critical aspect of Darwin's multifaceted theory is the role of random mutation.  Almost all of what is novel and important in Darwinian thought is concentrated in this third concept."  The Edge of Evolution, p. 2

In 1997, Russell Doolittle, on whose work Behe based much of the blood-clotting discussion in Darwin's Black Box, wrote a rebuttal to the statements about irreducible complexity of certain systems. In particular, Doolittle mentioned the issue of the blood clotting in his article, "A Delicate Balance." Later on, in 2003, Doolittle's lab published a paper in the peer-reviewed journal Proceedings of the National Academy of Sciences which demonstrates that the pufferfish lacks at least three out of 26 blood clotting factors, yet still has a workable blood clotting system. According to Doolittle, this defeats a key claim in Behe's book, that blood clotting is irreducibly complex.

In reviewing a book by Robert T. Pennock, Behe took issue with the "intelligent design" group being associated with "creationism," saying readers would typically take that to mean biblical literalism and young Earth creationism (YEC). In 2001 Pennock responded that he had been careful to represent their views correctly, and that while several leaders of the intelligent design movement were young Earth creationists, others including Behe were "old-earthers" and "creationists in the core sense of the term, namely, that they reject the scientific, evolutionary account of the origin of species and want to replace it with a form of special creation."

Behe and Snoke article
In 2004, Behe published a paper with David Snoke, in the scientific journal Protein Science that uses a simple mathematical model to simulate the rate of evolution of proteins by point mutation, which he states supports irreducible complexity, based on the calculation of the probability of mutations required for evolution to succeed. However, the paper does not mention intelligent design nor irreducible complexity, which were removed, according to Behe,  at the behest of the reviewers. Nevertheless, the Discovery Institute lists it as one of the "Peer-Reviewed & Peer-Edited Scientific Publications Supporting the Theory of Intelligent Design."

Michael Lynch authored a response, to which Behe and Snoke responded. Protein Science discussed the papers in an editorial.

Numerous scientists have debunked the work, pointing out that not only has it been shown that a supposedly irreducibly complex structure can evolve, but that it can do so within a reasonable time even subject to unrealistically harsh restrictions, and noting that Behe and Snoke's paper does not properly include natural selection and genetic redundancy. When the issue raised by Behe and Snoke is tested in the modern framework of evolutionary biology, numerous simple pathways to complexity have been shown. In their response, Behe and Snoke assumed that intermediate mutations are always damaging, where modern science allows for neutral or positive mutations. Some of the critics have also noted that the Discovery Institute continues to claim the paper as 'published evidence for design,' despite its offering no design theory nor attempting to model the design process, and therefore not providing an alternative to random chance.

Many of Behe's statements have been challenged by biologist Kenneth R. Miller in his book, Finding Darwin's God (1999). Behe has subsequently disputed Miller's points in an online essay.

The Edge of Evolution

In 2007, Behe's book The Edge of Evolution was published arguing that while evolution can produce changes within species, there is a limit to the ability of evolution to generate diversity, and this limit (the "edge of evolution") is somewhere between species and orders.

In this book Behe's central assertion is that Darwinian evolution actually exists but plays only a limited role in the development and diversification of life on Earth. To this aim, he examines the genetic changes undergone by the malaria plasmodium genome and the human genome in response to each other's biological defenses, and identifies that "the situation resembles trench warfare, not an arms race", by considering the hemoglobin-destroying, protein pump-compromising as a "war by attrition". Starting from this example, he takes into account the number of mutations required to "travel" from one genetic state to another, as well as population size for the organism in question. Then, Behe calculates what he calls the "edge of evolution", i.e., the point at which Darwinian evolution would no longer be an efficacious agent of creative biological change, arguing that purposeful design plays a major role in the development of biological complexity, through the mechanism of producing "non-random mutations", which are then subjected to the sculpting hand of natural selection
.

The book was reviewed, by prominent scientists in The New York Times, The New Republic, The Globe and Mail, Science, and Nature who were highly critical of the work noting that Behe appears to accept almost all of evolutionary theory, barring random mutation, which is replaced with guided mutation at the hand of an unnamed designer.  The book earned Behe the Pigasus Award for the year 2007.

Darwin Devolves 
Behe also promotes intelligent design in his 2019 book, Darwin Devolves whose central premise is that the combination of random mutation and natural selection, apart from being incapable of generating novelty, is mainly a degradative force. Like his previous books, Darwin Devolves received negative reviews from the scientific community, including a scathing review in Science by Nathan H. Lents, Richard Lenski, and S. Joshua Swamidass, a harsh critique by Jerry Coyne in The Washington Post, and a scholarly rebuttal in Evolution from Gregory Lang and Amber Rice, Behe's colleagues at Lehigh University. Lents said of Darwin Devolves and The Edge of Evolution: "his [ ] two books totally missed their marks and were easily dismissed by the scientific community."

Lang and Rice's assessment noted that while Behe rightfully acknowledges that organisms have common ancestry, it is posited that a designer is required for more distant relationships like at the family level, and that the presentation of degradative processes is exaggerated with evidence of beneficial adaptations dodged.  The article also criticized the use of false analogies and neglecting evidence of new genetic raw material production for evolution ("Behe is correct that the loss of genetic information is an important mechanism. However, the opposing processes of gene duplication, horizontal gene transfer, and introgression balance out gene loss, providing a source of new genetic material").  They then concluded with examples of adaptation that contradict the book's conclusions and expound on the flaws of Irreducible Complexity, adding that "why evolution by natural selection is difficult for so many to accept is beyond the scope of this review; however, it is not for a lack of evidence."

Popular writing 

Behe has written op-ed features in the Boston Review, The American Spectator, and The New York Times. Behe, along with fellow Discovery Institute associates William A. Dembski and David Berlinski, tutored Ann Coulter on science and evolution for her book Godless: The Church of Liberalism (2006). Coulter devotes approximately one-third of the book to polemics on evolution, which she terms "Darwinism." In the book, Coulter thanks Behe, Dembski and Berlinski for their assistance.

Court cases

Dover testimony 

In Kitzmiller v. Dover Area School District, the first direct challenge brought in United States federal courts to an attempt to mandate the teaching of intelligent design on First Amendment grounds, Behe was called as a primary witness for the defense and asked to support the idea that intelligent design was legitimate science. Some of the most crucial exchanges in the trial occurred during Behe's cross-examination, where his testimony would prove devastating to the defense. Behe was forced to concede that "there are no peer reviewed articles by anyone advocating for intelligent design supported by pertinent experiments or calculations which provide detailed rigorous accounts of how intelligent design of any biological system occurred" and that his definition of 'theory' as applied to intelligent design was so loose that astrology would also qualify. Earlier during his direct testimony, Behe had argued that a computer simulation of evolution he performed with Snoke shows that evolution is not likely to produce certain complex biochemical systems. Under cross examination however, Behe was forced to agree that "the number of prokaryotes in 1 ton of soil are 7 orders of magnitude higher than the population [it would take] to produce the disulfide bond" and that "it's entirely possible that something that couldn't be produced in the lab in two years... could be produced over three and half billion years."

Many of Behe's critics have pointed to these exchanges as examples they believe further undermine Behe's statements about irreducible complexity and intelligent design. John E. Jones III, the judge in the case, would ultimately rule that intelligent design is not scientific in his 139-page decision, citing Behe's testimony extensively as the basis for his findings:
"Consider, to illustrate, that Professor Behe remarkably and unmistakably claims that the plausibility of the argument for ID depends upon the extent to which one believes in the existence of God."
"As no evidence in the record indicates that any other scientific proposition's validity rests on belief in God, nor is the Court aware of any such scientific propositions, Professor Behe's assertion constitutes substantial evidence that in his view, as is commensurate with other prominent ID leaders, ID is a religious and not a scientific proposition."
"First, defense expert Professor Fuller agreed that ID aspires to 'change the ground rules' of science and lead defense expert Professor Behe admitted that his broadened definition of science, which encompasses ID, would also embrace astrology. Moreover, defense expert Professor Minnich acknowledged that for ID to be considered science, the ground rules of science have to be broadened to allow consideration of supernatural forces."
"What is more, defense experts concede that ID is not a theory as that term is defined by the NAS and admit that ID is at best 'fringe science' which has achieved no acceptance in the scientific community."
"We therefore find that Professor Behe's claim for irreducible complexity has been refuted in peer-reviewed research papers and has been rejected by the scientific community at large."
"ID proponents primarily argue for design through negative arguments against evolution, as illustrated by Professor Behe's argument that 'irreducibly complex' systems cannot be produced through Darwinian, or any natural, mechanisms. However, … arguments against evolution are not arguments for design. Expert testimony revealed that just because scientists cannot explain today how biological systems evolved does not mean that they cannot, and will not, be able to explain them tomorrow. As Dr. Padian aptly noted, 'absence of evidence is not evidence of absence.'… Irreducible complexity is a negative argument against evolution, not proof of design, a point conceded by defense expert Professor Minnich."
"Professor Behe's concept of irreducible complexity depends on ignoring ways in which evolution is known to occur. Although Professor Behe is adamant in his definition of irreducible complexity when he says a precursor 'missing a part is by definition nonfunctional,' what he obviously means is that it will not function in the same way the system functions when all the parts are present. For example in the case of the bacterial flagellum, removal of a part may prevent it from acting as a rotary motor. However, Professor Behe excludes, by definition, the possibility that a precursor to the bacterial flagellum functioned not as a rotary motor, but in some other way, for example as a secretory system."
"Professor Behe has applied the concept of irreducible complexity to only a few select systems: (1) the bacterial flagellum; (2) the blood-clotting cascade; and (3) the immune system. Contrary to Professor Behe's assertions with respect to these few biochemical systems among the myriad existing in nature, however, Dr. Miller presented evidence, based upon peer-reviewed studies, that they are not in fact irreducibly complex."
"In fact, on cross-examination, Professor Behe was questioned concerning his 1996 claim that science would never find an evolutionary explanation for the immune system. He was presented with fifty-eight peer-reviewed publications, nine books, and several immunology textbook chapters about the evolution of the immune system; however, he simply insisted that this was still not sufficient evidence of evolution, and that it was not "good enough."
"With ID, proponents assert that they refuse to propose hypotheses on the designer's identity, do not propose a mechanism, and the designer, he/she/it/they, has never been seen. ... In addition, Professor Behe agreed that for the design of human artifacts, we know the designer and its attributes and we have a baseline for human design that does not exist for design of biological systems. Professor Behe's only response to these seemingly insurmountable points of disanalogy was that the inference still works in science fiction movies."

Jones would later say that Eric Rothschild's cross examination of Behe was "as good a cross-examination of an expert witness as I have ever seen. It was textbook."

ACSI v. Roman Stearns

Behe received $20,000 for testifying as an expert witness on behalf of the plaintiffs in Association of Christian Schools International v. Roman Stearns. The case was filed by Association of Christian Schools International, which argued that the University of California was being discriminatory by not recognizing science classes that use creationist books. The 2005 filing claimed that University of California's rejection of several of their courses was illegal "viewpoint discrimination and content regulation prohibited by the Free Speech Clause." In 2007, Behe's expert witness report claimed that the Christian textbooks, including William S. Pinkston, Jr.'s Biology for Christian Schools (1980; 2nd ed. 1994), are excellent works for high school students. He defended that view in a deposition. In August 2008, Judge S. James Otero rejected Behe's claims, saying that Behe "submitted a declaration concluding that the BJU [Bob Jones University Press] text mentions standard scientific content. ... However, Professor Behe 'did not consider how much detail or depth' the texts gave to this standard content." Otero ruled in favor of the University of California's decision to reject courses using these books.

Personal life
Michael Behe is a devout Catholic. He is married to Celeste Behe and they have nine children who are homeschooled.

Publications

Books

 "Papers from a conference, entitled Design and its Critics, held at Concordia University, Mequon, Wis., June 22–24, 2000."

Journal articles
DNA structure

Protein structure

Evolution

Media articles

Film and video appearances

Notes

References

External links 

 Michael Behe Biography from Lehigh University
 Michael Behe Biography from the Discovery Institute
 Michael Behe Biography from the Access Research Network
 Irreducible Complexity and Michael Behe on intelligent design from the TalkOrigins Archive
 
 

1952 births
Living people
American activists
American biochemists
Discovery Institute fellows and advisors
Drexel University alumni
Fellows of the International Society for Complexity, Information, and Design
Intelligent design advocates
Lehigh University faculty
People from Altoona, Pennsylvania
Writers from Bethlehem, Pennsylvania
Writers from Harrisburg, Pennsylvania
University of Pennsylvania School of Arts and Sciences alumni
Queens College, City University of New York faculty
Catholics from Pennsylvania